was a Japanese daimyō of the early Edo period, who ruled the Hasunoike Domain in Hizen Province (modern-day Saga Prefecture).

References
 Naoyuki on Nekhet's "World Nobility" site (14 September 2007)

1643 births
1725 deaths
Tozama daimyo
Nabeshima clan